Khimki is a city in Moscow Oblast, Russia, 18.25 kilometres northwest of central Moscow, and immediately beyond the Moscow city boundary.

History

Origins and formation
Khimki was initially a railway station that existed since 1850 on the Moscow – Saint Petersburg Railway. The Moskva-Volga Canal was constructed between 1932 and 1937 on which Khimki lies on the west bank. Khimki was then officially founded in 1939.

Khimki in the Battle of Moscow
The German attack starting the Battle of Moscow (code-named ‘Operation Typhoon’) began on 2 October 1941. The attack on a broad front brought German forces to occupy the village of Krasnaya Polyana (now in the town of Lobnya) to Moscow's North West. Krasnaya Polyana was taken on 30 November.

Many sources state that at least one German army patrol visited Khimki. Among the sources stating the Germans visited Khimki the details of the date and unit involved are inconsistent and disputed. One story of events asserts a skirmish took place in Khimki on 16 October at the Leningradskoe Shosse bridge involving a German motorcycle unit, but this would have been far from the main body of German forces at that time. Another account is a patrol reached Khimki around 30 November or early December before returning to its main unit without combat. The dates mentioned for this second account vary. A myth surrounding this is that the Germans would have been able to see the Kremlin 19 kilometres in the distance from Khimki.

The Soviet Army counter offensive for "removing the immediate threat to Moscow" started on 5 December on the North-Western Front (the area around Khimki North West of Moscow). The South-Western Front and Western Fronts began their offensives on 6 December. The German forces were driven back. Moscow was never under such close land threat again during the war.

A memorial in the form of a giant tank trap is located at the "Kilometer 23" point ) of Leningradskoye Highway (the highway to St. Petersburg). The memorial was unveiled on 6 December 1966 as a 25th anniversary recognition of the launch of the Soviet counter offensive. This location is just short of an intersection with the Moscow–St Petersburg railway (close to where the IKEA shopping centre has since been built). This memorial and shopping centre on the Northern side of Khimki has a direct distance of 22 kilometres from Moscow city centre. At the time of the conflict this location was outside Khimki.

Post war
Khimki was home to several Soviet aerospace defense development centers that became the principal employers for the majority of the city population. This included R&D enterprises which designed surface-to-air missiles for S-75, S-125, S-200, S-300 Soviet air defense systems, engines for intercontinental ballistic missiles and satellite launch vehicles, and other types of equipment. For this reason, Khimki was off limits for all foreigners visiting the country, despite its location on a highway between Moscow and its major international airport.

In 2010 the city saw protests over the construction of the new Moscow–Saint Petersburg motorway  through the Khimki Forest.

The city of Khimki is adjacent to the city of Moscow, immediately beyond the Moscow Ring Road (MKAD).

Population
Population: 254,748 (2019 Census); 207,425 (2010 Census); 141,000 (2002 Census);  106,000 (1977); 23,000 (1939).

Administrative and municipal status
Within the framework of administrative divisions, it is incorporated as Khimki City Under Oblast Jurisdiction—an administrative unit with the status equal to that of the districts. As a municipal division, Khimki City Under Oblast Jurisdiction is incorporated as Khimki Urban Okrug.

Economy
The city enjoys a great deal of commercial activity due to its location between Moscow and one of its main airports, Sheremetyevo.

 some aerospace-development centers located in Khimki contribute to a program of the International Space Station. Former Soviet aerospace and defense development centers located in Khimki:
NPO Energomash is a company which primarily develops and produces liquid propellant rocket engines.
NPO Lavochkin is an aerospace company, a major player in the Russian space program.
MKB Fakel is a government-owned aerospace defense corporation dedicated to development of guided surface-to-air missiles.

Khimki hosts one of the largest shopping malls in Russia, which features French chain-store Auchan and Swedish furniture-retailer IKEA.

Transportation
Khimki station is on the Moscow-St Petersburg Railway.

Road transport includes bus and trolleybus.

Trolleybus routes
1. Ulitsa Druzhby (Friendship street) - Rodina Stadium;
2. Ulitsa Druzhby - Planernaya metro station;
3. Rodina Stadium - Planernaya metro station.

October Railway stations and platforms in Khimki
Levoberezhnaya
Khimki
Podrezkovo
Skhodnya
Firsanovskaya

Gallery

Sport
FC Khimki, association football club
BC Khimki, basketball club
WFC Rossiyanka, defunct women's association football club

Divided city
Khimki
at 1930 divided by Moscow Canal with right bank and left bank area and assigned "Levobereghnaya" (left bank) platform. The enter to M11 (Toll road) is also at left bank
at 1961 part of the city transferred to Moscow include Khimki hospital (known as "Stravinsky clinic" in Master and Margarita)
Some Moscow organizations remained in Khimky like Moscow State Art and Cultural University and Arena Khimky (de facto)
Skhodnya de jure merged but not adjustment to 2014. De facto Khimki, Skhodnya and the rest areas and enclaves were special fare zone earlier and this doesn't cause fare and legal collisions

Twin towns – sister cities

Khimki is twinned with:
 Grodno, Belarus

See also
Khimki War Memorial

References

Notes

Sources

External links

Official website of Khimki 
Khimki Business Directory 

 
Cities and towns built in the Soviet Union
Naukograds
Cities and towns in Moscow Oblast